Mojana Wedera (Amharic: ሞጃና ወደራ ) is one of the woredas in the Amhara Region of Ethiopia. Part of the Semien Shewa Zone, Mojana Wadera is bordered on the south by Basona Werana, on the northeast by Menz Lalo Midir, on the north by Menz Mam Midir, and on the east by Termaber. The administrative center of this woreda is Sela Dingay. Mojana Wadera was separated from Termaber woreda.

Demographics
Based on the 2007 national census conducted by the Central Statistical Agency of Ethiopia (CSA), this woreda has a total population of 69,667, of whom 35,186 are men and 34,481 women; 2,477 or 3.56% are urban inhabitants. The majority of the inhabitants practiced Ethiopian Orthodox Christianity, with 99.87% reporting that as their religion.

Notes

Districts of Amhara Region